The Agnes was a wooden carvel schooner built in 1875 at Brisbane Water. On 12 March 1890, whilst in ballast between Sydney and Tweed River, she lost her sails in a gale  and was wrecked north of Brunswick River heads. There were eight deaths.

References

Shipwrecks of the Richmond-Tweed Region
Ships built in New South Wales
1875 ships
Maritime incidents in 1890
1871–1900 ships of Australia
Merchant ships of Australia
Schooners of Australia